Gilbert Pratt (February 16, 1892 – December 10, 1954) was an American film director, actor and writer. He directed 87 films between 1917 and 1936. He was born in Providence, Rhode Island, and died in Los Angeles, California.

Selected filmography

 The Big Idea (1917)
 Move On (1917)
 We Never Sleep (1917)
 Clubs Are Trump (1917)
 Love, Laughs and Lather (1917)
 From Laramie to London (1917)
 Birds of a Feather (1917)
 Lonesome Luke Loses Patients (1917)
 Lonesome Luke's Wild Women (1917)
 Lonesome Luke, Messenger (1917)
 Stop! Luke! Listen! (1917)
 Lonesome Luke, Plumber (1917)
 Lonesome Luke's Honeymoon (1917)
 Lonesome Luke on Tin Can Alley (1917)
 Hear 'Em Rave (1918)
 Bees in His Bonnet (1918)
 Two Scrambled (1918)
 That's Him (1918)
 Are Crooks Dishonest? (1918)
 Sic 'Em, Towser (1918)
 The City Slicker (1918)
 The Non-Stop Kid (1918)
 It's a Wild Life (1918)
 Beat It (1918)
 Hit Him Again (1918)
 The Lamb (1918)
 The Tip (1918)
 Flips and Flops (1919)
 Going! Going! Gone! (1919)
 Wanted - $5,000 (1919)
 Mud and Sand (1922)
 The Egg (1922)
 Law of the North (1932)
 Boys Will Be Girls (1937)
 Saps at Sea (1940)

References

External links

1892 births
1954 deaths
American male film actors
American male silent film actors
American male screenwriters
Film directors from Rhode Island
20th-century American male actors
20th-century American male writers
20th-century American screenwriters